Imran Oulad Omar (born 11 December 1997) is a Dutch football player of Moroccan descent who plays as a midfielder. Besides the Netherlands, he has played in Slovakia, Romania, Georgia and Russia.

Club career
He made his professional debut in the Eerste Divisie for Achilles '29 on 21 October 2016 in a game against Waalwijk.

References

External links
 
 

1997 births
Dutch sportspeople of Moroccan descent
Footballers from Amsterdam
Association football midfielders
Living people
Dutch footballers
Achilles '29 players
AS Trenčín players
Slovak Super Liga players
FC Den Bosch players
Eerste Divisie players
LPS HD Clinceni players
Liga I players
FC Locomotive Tbilisi players
Erovnuli Liga players
FC Rotor Volgograd players
Expatriate footballers in Romania
Dutch expatriate sportspeople in Romania
Expatriate footballers in Slovakia
Dutch expatriate sportspeople in Slovakia
Expatriate footballers in Georgia (country)
Dutch expatriate sportspeople in Georgia (country)
Expatriate footballers in Russia
Dutch expatriate sportspeople in Russia